Just Over This Mountain is a 1993 album by Skydiggers. The album is noted for its laid-back style and harmony singing.

Track listing
 "Pull Me Down"  – 4:20 (Anderson/Cash/Finlayson/Macey/Maize/Stokes)
 "I'm Wondering"  – 4:36 (Cash)
 "Just Over This Mountain"  – 3:31 (Finlayson/Maize)
 "She Comes Into the Room"  – 4:28 (Cash)
 "I Thought I Knew You"  – 3:40 (Finlayson/Maize)
 "Darkness and Doubt"  – 4:53 (Cash)
 "This is No Time"  – 3:36 (Cash/Finlayson/Macey/Maize/Melville/Stokes)
 "Joanne"  – 2:33 (Finlayson/Maize)
 "You Got That Look in Your Eye"  – 4:02 (Cash)
 "Shimmy Up Those Words"  – 2:48 (Finlayson/Maize)
 "80 Odd Hours"  – 3:08 (Cash)
 "Ramblin' On"  – 3:55 (Cash)

References

1993 albums
Skydiggers albums